Mohammad Raza Hayat Harraj (born 21 July 1969) is a Pakistani politician who had been a member of the National Assembly of Pakistan, from 2002 to May 2018.

Early life and education
According to PILDAT, he was born on 21 July 1968. According to The News International, he was born on 21 July 1969.

He received his LLB degree from University of Leicester in 1992.

Political career

He was elected to the National Assembly of Pakistan as a candidate of Pakistan Peoples Party (PPP) from Constituency NA-156 (Khanewal-I) in 2002 Pakistani general election. He received 86,438 votes and defeated Fakhar Imam, a candidate of Pakistan Muslim League (Q) (PML-Q). He became part of Musharraf cabinet and served as Minister of State for Parliamentary Affairs.

He was re-elected to the National Assembly as a candidate of PML-Q from Constituency NA-156 (Khanewal-I) in 2008 Pakistani general election. He received 71,381 votes and defeated Fakhar Imam, a candidate of PPP.

He was re-elected to the member of the National Assembly as an independent candidate from Constituency NA-156 (Khanewal-I) in 2013 Pakistani general election. He received 79,675 votes and defeated Fakhar Imam, a candidate of Pakistan Muslim League (N) (PML-N). He was accused of rigging in the election and Fakhar Imam filled rigging petition against him in the Election Commission of Pakistan. In May 2013, he joined PML-N.

In March 2018, he quit PML-N and joined Pakistan Tehreek-e-Insaf.

References

Living people
1969 births
Pakistani MNAs 2002–2007
Pakistani MNAs 2008–2013
Pakistani MNAs 2013–2018
Pakistan Muslim League (Q) MNAs
Pakistan People's Party MNAs
Pakistan Muslim League (N) MNAs